The 1998 Wake Forest Demon Deacons football team was an American football team that represented Wake Forest University during the 1998 NCAA Division I-A football season. In their sixth season under head coach Jim Caldwell, the Demon Deacons compiled a 3–8 record and finished in a tie for sixth place in the Atlantic Coast Conference.

Schedule

Team leaders

References

Wake Forest
Wake Forest Demon Deacons football seasons
Wake Forest Demon Deacons football